Ceracanthia vepreculella is a species of snout moth. It was described by Émile Louis Ragonot in 1893 and is known from Ecuador.

References

Moths described in 1893
Phycitinae